The Great Northern Railway (Ireland) SG and SG2 classes was one of the last designs of Charles Clifford.   They were primarily intended for goods work, but the increased wheel diameter enabled effective passenger duties, managing heavy excursion trains with ease and speed.

Beyer, Peacock and Company built the first two batches in 1913 and 1915 and the 1924-25 batch were built by Nasmyth, Wilson and Company.

Design

Engines were originally built with flush riveted smokeboxes. After the first major overhaul, domed rivets were used.   These locomotives originally ran with flared tenders, but at a later date  straight sided tenders were also used.

When first brought into service, the five SG’s were originally numbered 137, 138, 37, 40 and 41. The last three were renumbered 47, 48, 49 and the whole series was finally renumbered 175, 176, 177, 178, 179.

Differences
The major difference was in the brake rods of which there were two inboard of the wheels. The earlier SO and 562 locomotives had four pull-rods, the outer ones being outside of the wheels.

The 1915 batch (Classified 52 and 502) had direct motion, without rocker arms, driving inclined piston valves, and Robinson superheater. The only external difference was that the shaft and reversing rod were a little higher which resulted in the rear of the left hand side sandbox rod being inclined upwards from the centre sandbox back to the firebox.

The Wakefield mechanical lubricator was mounted further back on the 502. These locomotives were also fitted with Ross pop safety valves as built. The 1913 batch had lever safety valves changed to Ross pop type after first major overhaul after 10 years.

CIÉ ownership
On the break-up of the GNR(I) in 1958, Córas Iompair Éireann took over a number of these locomotives for a period of five years up to the end of steam on CIÉ. They were used particularly on the ex-DSER services to Wexford and Rosslare. CIÉ retained the GNR(I) numbers, with suffix N except in the case of No.19, also ‘CIE’ was stencilled on the locomotive buffer beams. After withdrawal, some locomotives, including 15N, 179N, and 181N were kept in reserve by CIÉ, some until 1965.

Model 
The SG Class is currently available as a 00 gauge etched-brass kit from Studio Scale Models.  It includes transfers, brass etches, most nameplates and cast white metal parts.

See also
 Diesel Locomotives of Ireland
 Multiple Units of Ireland
 Coaching Stock of Ireland
 Steam locomotives of Ireland

References

Further reading
 

SG
0-6-0 locomotives
Beyer, Peacock locomotives
Nasmyth, Wilson and Company locomotives
Steam locomotives of Northern Ireland
Steam locomotives of Ireland
Railway locomotives introduced in 1913
Scrapped locomotives
5 ft 3 in gauge locomotives
C h2 locomotives